Izadabad may refer to:
 Izadabad, Anbarabad, Kerman Province
 Izadabad, Malekabad, Sirjan County, Kerman Province
 Izadabad, Khoy, West Azerbaijan Province